Manon Briand (born January 1, 1964, in Baie-Comeau, Quebec) is a Canadian film director and screenwriter. After graduating in film studies from Concordia University, Briand went to France to study screenwriting in 1987. Returning home, she co-founded an independent filmmakers’ group, Les Films de l’Autre, and soon began directing. Her films include Letters of Transit (Les Sauf-conduits), a segment in Cosmos, 2 Seconds, Chaos and Desire, Liverpool and the television film Heart: The Marilyn Bell Story.

References

External links

1964 births
Canadian women film directors
Canadian women screenwriters
Film directors from Quebec
People from Baie-Comeau
Concordia University alumni
French Quebecers
Living people
Canadian screenwriters in French
Canadian Film Centre alumni